is a ninth-century Shingon temple in Uda, Nara Prefecture, Japan. It is located approximately four kilometres southwest of Murō-ji across Mount Murō.

History
An inscription on the temple bell of 863 similarly celebrates the temple's foundation by Kenne. Only a fragment of the bell now survives, preserved at the temple; the inscription is known from copies, including a fourteenth-century version now housed at Kanazawa Bunko. A  in the same collection, dating to 1314, locates Kenne's grave at the temple; it is generally identified with Butsuryū-ji's unusual stone chamber with pyramidal roof. Although the present buildings are more recent, a statue of Kenne still stands beside those of Kukai and Jūichimen Kannon on the altar.

Since both Butsuryū-ji and Murō-ji could be referred to as Mount Murō, it appears that the two were sometimes confused or conflated: an early eighteenth-century encyclopaedia refers to the former as Nyonin Kōya or "Kōyasan for Women", an appellation usually reserved for the latter, referring to the ban on female visitation, relaxed in 1872. A stone marker on the road to Butsuryū-ji still proclaims "Mount Murō Nyonin Kōya".

Cultural Properties
 Stone chamber, dated to the ninth century or late Heian period (Important Cultural Property)
 Nine-hundred-year-old cherry tree (Prefectural Natural Monument)
There is also a thirteen-storey stone tō dating to 1330 and dedicated to Shũen, important figure in the early history of Murō-ji.

See also

 List of Important Cultural Properties of Japan (Heian period: structures)
 Murō-Akame-Aoyama Quasi-National Park

References

Buddhist temples in Nara Prefecture
Uda, Nara
Shingon Buddhism
Important Cultural Properties of Japan
Religious buildings and structures completed in 850